The 34th Iowa Infantry Regiment was an infantry regiment that served in the Union Army during the American Civil War.

Service
The 34th Iowa Infantry was organized at Burlington, Iowa and mustered in for three years of Federal service on October 15, 1862.

The regiment was mustered out on August 15, 1865.

Total strength and casualties
A total of 1081 men served in the 34th Iowa at one time or another during its existence.
It suffered 1 officer and 11 enlisted men who were killed in action or who died of their wounds and 2 officers and 244 enlisted men who died of disease, for a total of 258 fatalities.

Commanders
 Colonel George W. Clark - Appointed colonel September 1, 1862 and mustered October 15, 1862; transferred to command Consolidated 34th and 38th Regiment, January 1, 1864; brevet brigadier general, April 9, 1864; mustered out with regiment on August 15, 1865.

See also
List of Iowa Civil War Units
Iowa in the American Civil War

Notes

References
The Civil War Archive

Units and formations of the Union Army from Iowa
Burlington, Iowa
Military units and formations established in 1862
1862 establishments in Iowa
Military units and formations disestablished in 1865